El Che is the second studio album by Chicago rapper Rhymefest, released on June 8, 2010. The album was released under dNBe Entertainment and EMI Records, who picked up the album after it was dropped by J Records as a result of creative differences.

Rhymefest recorded El Che at Soundscape Studios in Chicago, Illinois with Grammy-Award winning engineer/producer, Michael Kolar. Rhymefest utilized his UStream, and broadcast recording sessions live, chatting and replying to fans through his personal Twitter account.

Track listing
The track listing was confirmed by Nah Right and Fake Shore Drive.

Charts

References

2010 albums
Albums produced by Mark Ronson
Albums produced by Scram Jones
Albums produced by Symbolyc One
Albums produced by Best Kept Secret (production team)
EMI Records albums